Kōji, Koji, Kohji or Kouji is a masculine Japanese given name. Notable people with the name include:

, Japanese comedian
, Japanese footballer
, Japanese film director
, Japanese voice actor
, Japanese comedian and TV presenter
, Japanese video game producer and director
, Japanese comedian, tarento and TV presenter
Koji Inada (disambiguation), multiple people
, Japanese voice actor
, picture-book author and illustrator
Koji Ishikawa (artist) (born 1968), Japanese painter
, Japanese professional wrestler
, Japanese ice hockey player
, Japanese ski jumper
, Japanese table tennis player
, Japanese scientist
, Japanese actor and model
, composer of video game music
, Japanese boxer
, Japanese director
, Japanese actor and television personality
, Japanese politician
, Japanese handball player
, Japanese actor
, Japanese professional wrestling historian
, Japanese footballer
, Japanese businessman, CEO of Nomura Holdings
, Japanese comedian
, Japanese musician, and former guitarist and lead singer for the Japanese rock band Supercar
Koji Nakano (disambiguation), multiple people
, Japanese curler
, Japanese footballer
, Japanese politician
, Japanese triple jumper
, Japanese sport wrestler
, Japanese footballer
, Japanese photographer
, Japanese politician
, anime director
, former Japanese football player
, Japanese film director
, Japanese actor
, Japanese film director, actor and screenwriter
, Japanese long-distance runner
, Japanese gymnast
, Japanese writer
, Japanese footballer
, Japanese actor
, lead singer of Anzen Chitai (安全地帯)
, Japanese shogi player
, Japanese shogi player
, Japanese voice actor
, singer and actor
, Japanese baseball player
, Japanese rock singer
, Japanese ice hockey player
, Japanese water polo player
, Japanese tennis player
Koji Yamamoto (disambiguation), multiple people
, Japanese general
, Japanese voice actor

Fictional characters 
Koji, character from Brawlhalla
Kouji (Kenny), character from Stitch!
Kohji Haneda, character from Case Closed
Koji Haruta, character from Toradora!
Koji Kabuto, character from Mazinger Z
Kouji Kasuga, character from Silver Kamen
Kouji Minamoto, character from Digimon Frontier
Koji Nakaoka, character from Barefoot Gen
Koji Nakano, character from Captain Tsubasa
Koji (Ōban), character from Ōban Star-Racers
Kouji Sekimukai, character from Haikyū!!

Japanese masculine given names